Protodouvillininae is an extinct subfamily of prehistoric brachiopods in the extinct family Douvillinidae. The type genus is Protodouvillina.

Genera 
 Bojodouvillina 
 Contradouvillina 
 Cymostrophia 
 Douvillinella 
 Hercostrophia 
 Malurostrophia 
 Megastrophiella 
 Moravostrophia 
 Nadiastrophia 
 Paucistrophia 
 Phragmostrophia 
 Protodouvillina 
 Radiomena 
 Taemostrophia 
 Teichostrophia 
 Telaeoshaleria

References

External links 

 Protodouvillininae at fossilworks.org

Paleozoic brachiopods
Prehistoric animal subfamilies
Strophomenida